Mustafa Saadoon Hantoosh (28 January 1994 – 23 April 2021) was an Iraqi professional footballer who played as a goalkeeper.

Club career 
Saadoon started playing football from a young age, as a goalkeeper with his friends in the streets of Jisr Diyala, a neighbourhood in Baghdad, Iraq. He played for the youth setups of Al-Quwa Al-Jawiya and Al-Shorta before moving to Al-Kahrabaa, where he played for multiple seasons.

Saadoon joined Al-Naft on 17 July 2015, and played in the 2018–19 Arab Club Champions Cup, Al-Naft's first participation in the competition. He played for Al-Naft in the Iraqi Premier League up to and including the 2020–21 season, until his death in 2021.

International career 
Saadoun was called up for the Iraq national under-20 team for the 2011 Arab Cup U-20 and for the Iraq national under-23 team for the 2016 AFC U-23 Championship, but did not play a game in either tournament. His only call-up for the senior team came in 2018, as an unused substitute in a friendly against Palestine.

Personal life 
In 2020, Saadoon volunteered for German humanitarian organization "Without Borders", providing assistance for people infected with COVID-19.

Death 
On 18 April 2021, Saadoon suffered from a sudden stroke during a training session with Al-Naft, and was transferred to the Baghdad Medical City. He died five days later, on 23 April.

References

External links
 

1994 births
2021 deaths
Iraqi footballers
Association football goalkeepers
Al-Quwa Al-Jawiya players
Al-Shorta SC players
Al-Kahrabaa FC players
Al-Naft SC players
Iraqi Premier League players
Sport deaths in Asia